Alleniella complanata is a species of moss belonging to the family Neckeraceae.

References

Neckeraceae